Moskalenki is an urban-type settlement in the Moskalensky District in Omsk Oblast, Russia. In 2017 the population was 9,271.

Geography
Moskalenki is located on the Trans-Siberian Railway. It is located next to Yekaterinovka, Golbshtadt, and 86 kilometers (53 mi) west of Omsk, the administrative center of the oblast.

History
The place was founded for the railway station Kotshubayevo in 1894 and was renamed into Moskalenki in 1905. Villages were built around the railway station which were called Olgino and changed its name to Moskalenki (like the railway station) in 1969

The settlements around Moskalenki used to be inhabited mainly by German-speaking Russian Mennonites, which immigrated to Moskalenki from the Ukraine in the 20th century. Plautdietsch is still spoken by them.

References

Urban-type settlements in Omsk Oblast